Mikhail Bogdanov may refer to:
 Mikhail Bogdanov (artist) (1914–1995), Soviet production designer
 Mikhail Bogdanov (diplomat) (born 1952), Russian deputy foreign minister and representative to the Arab League
 Mikhail Bogdanov (revolutionary) (1881–1937), Russian revolutionary, briefly chairman of the Kiev Gubernatorial Committee of the Communist Party of Ukraine
 Mikhail Bogdanov (cossack) (18th century), a colonel of Chernihiv regiment (1723–1735) in Cossack Hetmanate